Patea is a former New Zealand electorate in south Taranaki. It existed from 1893 to 1963.

Population centres
In the 1892 electoral redistribution, population shift to the North Island required the transfer of one seat from the South Island to the north. The resulting ripple effect saw every electorate established in 1890 have its boundaries altered, and eight electorates were established for the first time, including Patea.

The electorate was based on the town of Patea, which used to have a freezing-works for the preparation of meat for export until 1982.

History
This rural seat was first established for the 1893 election. George Hutchison was the first elected representative. He resigned in June 1901. Frederick Haselden won the 1 August 1901 by-election, but the seat was declared vacant in the following year. Walter Symes then held the electorate, from 1902 to the dissolution of Parliament in 1908.

The 1908 election was won by George Pearce. He held the electorate for three terms, until the dissolution of Parliament in 1919. He was succeeded by Walter Powdrell from 1919, who died partway through the term on 9 March 1921. Edwin Dixon won the 1921 by-election and held the electorate for the remainder of the term until 1922. James Randall Corrigan succeeded Dixon in 1922 and he held the electorate for one term until 1925. He was followed by Harold Dickie from 1925 to 1943.

William Sheat won the 1943 election plus the three subsequent elections. In 1954, Sheat failed to gain reselection after boundary changes as a National Party candidate. On 14 May of that year, he promptly resigned his seat and won it back in the 31 July 1954 by-election as an Independent, but subsequently did not stand in the 1954 general election.

The candidate chosen instead of Sheat, Roy Jack, was successful in 1954. He held the electorate until 1963, when it was abolished and replaced by the Waimarino electorate.

Members of Parliament
Key

Election results

1954 election

|}

1954 by-election

1951 election

|}

1931 election

1928 election

1921 by-election

November 1901 by-election

July 1901 by-election

1899 election

Notes

References

Historical electorates of New Zealand
Politics of Taranaki
1893 establishments in New Zealand
1963 disestablishments in New Zealand
Patea